Immigration law includes the national statutes, regulations, and legal precedents governing immigration into and deportation from a country. Strictly speaking, it is distinct from other matters such as naturalization and citizenship, although they are sometimes conflated.  Countries frequently maintain laws that regulate both the rights of entry and exit as well as internal rights, such as the duration of stay, freedom of movement, and the right to participate in commerce or government.

Immigration laws vary around the world and throughout history, according to the social and political climate of the place and time, as the acceptance of immigrants sways from the widely inclusive to the deeply nationalist and isolationist. National laws regarding the immigration of citizens of that country are regulated by international law. The United Nations' International Covenant on Civil and Political Rights mandates that all countries allow entry to their own citizens.

Control measures
To control immigration, many countries set up customs at entry points. Some common location for entry points are airports and roads near the border. At the customs department, travel documents are inspected. Some required documents are a passport, an international certificate of vaccination and an onward ticket. Sometimes travelers are also required to declare or register the amount of money they are carrying.

Immigration law by country or territory

Immigration visa categories by country or territory

This section is an attempt to classify and bring together information about immigration legislation on a number of countries with high immigration.

General guidelines by country or territory

See also
 Asylum shopping
 Refugee identity certificate
 Migrant worker
 Immigration policy
 Impediment to expulsion
 Economic citizenship
 Points-based immigration system
 Immigrant investor programs

References

Notes

External links
 Citizenship Laws of the World – the most comprehensive although a little bit outdated report by United States Office of Personnel Management Investigations Service PDF, copy: PDF